Oulad Settout (Tarifit: Wlad Sttut, ⵡⵍⴰⴷ ⵙⵜⵜⵓⵜ; Arabic: اولاد ستوت) is a commune in the Nador Province of the Oriental administrative region of Morocco. At the time of the 2004 census, the commune had a total population of 22173 people living in 3875 households.

References

Populated places in Nador Province
Rural communes of Oriental (Morocco)